Semin may refer to:


People

Given name
Semin Öztürk Şener (born 1991), Turkish female professional aerobatic pilot

Surname
Alexander Semin (born 1984), Russian professional ice hockey winger
Dmitri Semin (born 1983), Russian professional ice hockey player
Yuri Semin (born 1947), Russian football coach
Alternate spelling of Syomin (name), a Russian surname

Places
Semin, Donji Vakuf, a village in Bosnia and Herzegovina
Semín, a village in the Pardubice Region of the Czech Republic
Semin, Indonesia, a district in Gunung Kidul Regency, Special Region, Yogyakarta, Indonesia
Semin, Russia, a rural locality (khutor) in Yakovlevsky District, Belgorod Oblast, Russia